Stanley Colman (6 January 1862 – 27 February 1942) was an English cricketer. He played six first-class matches for Surrey in 1882.

See also
 List of Surrey County Cricket Club players

References

External links
 

1862 births
1942 deaths
English cricketers
Surrey cricketers
People from Clapham
Cricketers from Greater London